{{Infobox book | 
| name          = Ireland: Awakening (US title The Rebels of Ireland: The Dublin Saga)
| title_orig    =  
| translator    =  
| image         = Ireland Awakening.jpg 
| caption       = First edition cover
| author        = Edward Rutherfurd
| cover_artist  =  
| country       = England
| language      = English
| series        = The Dublin Saga
| genre         = Historical novel
| publisher     = Century Hutchinson
| pub_date      = 2 March 2006
| media_type    = Print (Hardback & Paperback)
| pages         = 896 pp (first edition, hardback)
| isbn = 978-1-84413-794-7
| isbn_note = (first edition, hardback)
| oclc          = 62479060
| preceded_by   = Dublin: Foundation
| followed_by   = 
}}Ireland: Awakening  (2006) (also known in North America as The Rebels of Ireland: The Dublin Saga) is a novel by Edward Rutherfurd first published in 2006 by Century Hutchinson. It concludes the two-part series known as The Dublin Saga.

Plot summary
This sequel to Dublin: Foundation also set in Ireland follows the clans or families of the O'Byrnes, Walshes, MacGowans etc. In addition to the previous novel other families appear on the scene and together they live through the Cromwellian period, the Protestant Ascendancy and the Famine.

Publishing history
2006, UK, Century, pub date 2 March 2006, hardback (First edition)
2006, Canada, Doubleday Canada, pub date 2 March 2006, hardback (as The Rebels of Ireland: The Dublin Saga)
2007, USA, Ballantine Books, pub date 27 February 2007, paperback (as The Rebels of Ireland: The Dublin Saga'')
2007, UK, Arrow Books, pub date 1 March 2007, paperback

References

2006 British novels
Historical novels
Novels by Edward Rutherfurd
Novels set in Ireland
Hutchinson (publisher) books